The Setomorphinae are a subfamily of moth of the family Tineidae.

Genera
 Lindera
 Prosetomorpha
 Setomorpha

References